The Wiesbadener Kreuz is a full cloverleaf interchange near the Hessian state capital of Wiesbaden in Germany where the Autobahnen A3 and A66 meet. It lies within the northeastern edge of Hochheim am Main. The interchange was opened in 1939 and was one of the first interchanges in Germany.

Used by approximately 210,000 vehicles per day, it is one of the most frequented interchanges in Hesse and Germany.

The portion of the A3 between the Wiesbadener Kreuz and Kreuz Fürth/Erlangen is traditionally one of the most congested sections of Autobahn in Germany.

The road has over the years undergone many projects to improve traffic flow and repairing/replacing the surface, including replacing the bridges that take the A3 over the A66.

Redesign 

In April 2011 planning was begun for a move away from the cloverleaf shape to something more suitable for higher traffic volumes, specially to remove two of the 270 degree turns.  Instead, it was proposed to adopt a variant which was developed by the Hessian Road and Traffic Administration of two left-turning, semi-direct connecting arcs. The connecting ramps of the routes between Wiesbaden and Würzburg as well as between Cologne and Frankfurt are to be run in two lanes. The planned variant is the best solution in terms of road safety, environmental compatibility and economic efficiency. The published site plan for the project seems to require a new implementation of the Wandersmann monument. A specific time frame for the start of the construction work was not set and as of September 2021 no further work along these lines has been developed, and the interchange is not listed for any forthcoming projects according to Autobahn GmbH.

Traffic volume 
The interchange is after the Frankfurter Kreuz and the Offenbacher Kreuz the most congested Autobahn interchanges in Hessen with approx. 210.000 Vehicles per day.

References

External links 
 Webcam am Wiesbadener Kreuz (hr-online.de)

External links

Autobahns in Germany
Road interchanges in Germany
Roads in Hesse
Transport in Wiesbaden